Statherotoxys is a genus of moths belonging to the subfamily Olethreutinae of the family Tortricidae.

Species
Statherotoxys acrorhaga Diakonoff, 1973
Statherotoxys eurydelta Diakonoff, 1973
Statherotoxys hedraea (Meyrick, 1905)
Statherotoxys hypochrysa Diakonoff, 1973
Statherotoxys niphophora Diakonoff, 1973
Statherotoxys pudica Diakonoff, 1973

See also
List of Tortricidae genera

References

External links
tortricidae.com

Tortricidae genera
Olethreutinae
Taxa named by Alexey Diakonoff